Mark John Grisanti (born October 21, 1964) is an American lawyer, politician, and judge from New York. After being elected to the New York State Senate in District 60 as a Republican in 2010, Grisanti took office as a State Senator on January 3, 2011. Grisanti served in the State Senate from 2011 to 2014, when he was defeated in the Republican primary and in the general election. Grisanti was appointed to the New York State Court of Claims in May 2015 and later became an Acting Justice of the Supreme Court of the State of New York, Eighth Judicial District.

Grisanti is notable as one of four Republican members of the New York State Senate that voted in favor of the Marriage Equality Act in 2011.

Early life, education, and early career
Grisanti was raised in Buffalo as the youngest of six brothers and sisters. He graduated from Canisius College and Thomas M. Cooley Law School. After graduating from law school, Grisanti worked at the law firm that his grandfather had founded in 1921.

New York State Senate career

Elections

2008 State Senate campaign
Grisanti was defeated in the 2008 Democratic primary for the 60th Senate District, losing heavily to Antoine Thompson, 72 to 28 percent; Thompson went on to win the senate seat in the state's 2008 general election.

2010 State Senate campaign
Grisanti stood for election to the State Senate again in the 2010 state senate elections; this time, he ran as a Republican. During his campaign, Grisanti declared himself to be "unalterably opposed" to same-sex marriage.

Grisanti defeated incumbent Senator Antoine Thompson by 525 votes. His victory, which was initially challenged, was considered an upset.  Grisanti's victory helped the GOP obtain regain the Senate majority by a slender 32-30 margin.

As of 2011, the 60th Senate District was the most Democratic-leaning of the all Republican-held Senate seats, with 104,000 registered Democrats and 22,000 registered Republicans.  Although Grisanti was a registered Democrat during the race, he received a waiver to run on the Republican line. After his victory, he agreed to caucus with Senate Republicans and switched his party registration to Republican.

2012 State Senate campaign
In 2012, Grisanti received significant support and visibility from Senate Republicans; the party engaged in a "Protect Grisanti" effort to increase his electability in the lead-up to the elections. According to The Buffalo News, he also received "significant contributions from the gay community" on the heels of his 2011 vote for same-sex marriage.

Grisanti faced a challenge in the Republican primary for the 60th district from attorney Kevin Stocker of Kenmore, NY. Grisanti won the primary with a 60 percent to 40 percent margin after a campaign in which "much of the bitterest politicking had revolved around Grisanti's controversial 2011 vote to support legalizing same-sex marriage in the state."  "We took the high road, because we don't care about the smut, we care about what is important for the residents of Western New York," Grisanti said. Grisanti's primary campaign was more successful than the primary campaigns of the other two Senate Republicans who voted for same-sex marriage and ran for re-election; Sen. Stephen Saland barely defeated his primary challenger, while Sen. Roy J. McDonald was defeated by Kathy Marchione.

Grisanti's same-sex marriage vote also cost him the Conservative Party line. Both the Conservative Party and the National Organization for Marriage endorsed Charles Swanick to run against Sen. Grisanti in 2012.

Grisanti won re-election in the 2012 general election, receiving 63,683 votes. Democratic candidate Michael L. Amodeo came in second with 45,140 votes, Charles Swanick received 15,027 votes on the Conservative line, and Gregory Davis received 3,078 votes on the Working Families Party line.

2014 State Senate campaign
Sen. Grisanti was defeated by Kevin Stocker in a Republican primary in September 2014. While Sen. Grisanti remained in the 2014 general election race on a third-party line, he finished in third place in a hotly contested election; the winner, Democrat Marc Panepinto, received only 3,681 votes more than Grisanti did.

Tenure
Grisanti had declared his opposition to same-sex marriage during his 2010 campaign. On June 24, 2011, following multiple meetings with Democratic New York Governor Andrew Cuomo, Grisanti voted in favor of the Marriage Equality Act, which allows gender-neutral marriages for both same- and opposite-sex couples in New York. Grisanti stated that he had researched the issue and that "a man can be wiser today than yesterday, but there can be no respect for that man if he has failed to do his duty." Grisanti was one of four Republican state senators that voted in favor of the Marriage Equality Act.

On February 11, 2012, Grisanti was involved in an altercation at a fundraising gala held at the Seneca Niagara Casino. The altercation involved a casino shareholder who accused the senator of hating the Seneca nation, which owns the casino. Grisanti said he had been attacked after trying to mediate a dispute. No charges were filed.

In January 2013, Sen. Grisanti voted in favor of the NY SAFE Act, a controversial gun control measure.

Also in 2013, Grisanti was a signatory to an amicus curiae brief submitted to the Supreme Court in support of same-sex marriage in the Hollingsworth v. Perry case.

Judicial career
In 2015, Grisanti was appointed to the New York State Court of Claims by Gov. Andrew Cuomo. Grisanti's appointment was confirmed by the New York State Senate in May 2015. As of October 2018, Grisanti serves as an Acting Justice of the New York State Supreme Court for the Eighth Judicial District.

See also

 List of American politicians who switched parties in office
List of Canisius College people
List of New York State Senators
List of people from Buffalo, New York

References

External links
 Sen. Mark Grisanti

1964 births
Living people
New York (state) Democrats
New York (state) lawyers
New York (state) Republicans
New York (state) state senators
Politicians from Buffalo, New York
Politicians from Lansing, Michigan
Canisius College alumni
Western Michigan University Cooley Law School alumni
21st-century American politicians
Lawyers from Buffalo, New York